Pedro Juan García Figueroa is a Puerto Rican politician and the current mayor of Hormigueros. García is affiliated with the Popular Democratic Party (PPD) and has served as mayor since 2005. Has a master's degree in science for physical education from the New York University.

References

1956 births
Living people
Mayors of places in Puerto Rico
New York University alumni
Popular Democratic Party (Puerto Rico) politicians
People from Hormigueros, Puerto Rico
Puerto Rican people of Galician descent
Year of birth missing (living people)